The lesser ranee mouse (Haeromys pusillus) is a species of rodent in the family Muridae. It is found on the island of Borneo and the Palawan region (Philippines). Its natural habitat is subtropical or tropical dry forests.

References

Haeromys
Rodents of Malaysia
Rodents of Indonesia
Rodents of the Philippines
Mammals described in 1893
Taxa named by Oldfield Thomas
Taxonomy articles created by Polbot